Farkaspatak is the Hungarian name for two villages in Romania:

 Lupoaia village, Holod Commune, Bihor County
 Valea Lupului village, Baru Commune, Hunedoara County